Chertkovsky District is an administrative and municipal district (raion), one of the forty-three in Rostov Oblast, Russia. It is located in the northwest of the oblast. Its administrative center is the rural locality (a settlement) of Chertkovo. Population: 36,680 (2010 Census);  The population of Chertkovo accounts for 29.5% of the district's total population.

References

Notes

Sources

Districts of Rostov Oblast